Charaxes manica, the Manica charaxes, is a butterfly in the family Nymphalidae. It is found in Zimbabwe, western Mozambique and Zambia. The habitat consists of Brachystegia woodland.

Adults are on wing year round.

The larvae feed on Albizia antunesiana, Dalbergiella nyasae, Albizia antunesiana, Brachystegia spiciformis, Brachystegia boehmii and Dalbergia lactea.

Taxonomy
Charaxes manica is a member of the large species group Charaxes etheocles.
The male is very similar to both Charaxes howarthi and Charaxes chintechi

References

Seitz, A. Die Gross-Schmetterlinge der Erde 13: Die Afrikanischen Tagfalter. Plate XIII 33 a
Victor Gurney Logan Van Someren, 1966 Revisional notes on African Charaxes (Lepidoptera: Nymphalidae). Part III. Bulletin of the British Museum (Natural History) (Entomology) 45-101.
Victor Gurney Logan Van Someren, 1972 Revisional notes on African Charaxes (Lepidoptera: Nymphalidae). Part VIII. Bulletin of the British Museum (Natural History) (Entomology)215-264. Further notes

External links
Images of  C. manica Royal Museum for Central Africa (Albertine Rift Project)
Charaxes manica images at Consortium for the Barcode of Life
Charaxes manica/chiityi images at BOLD
Charaxes manica f. pseudophaeus images at BOLD
Charaxes manica subrubidus images at BOLD
Charaxes chittyi  images at BOLD

Butterflies described in 1894
manica
Butterflies of Africa